Garmsiri or Bandari
is a Southwestern Iranian language spoken in the southeast of Iran in Hormozgan Province. 
It consists of closely related dialects extending from the Halilrud river valley in the north down to the Strait of Hormuz in the south.
The language is closely related to Bashkardi, Larestani and Kumzari. It forms a transitional dialect group to northwestern Iranian Balochi, due to intense areal contact.

Varieties
Garmsiri varieties and locations include:
Marzi Gal (Northern Bashkardi)
Korta
Hormozgan Pahlavani (Pahlavani)
Rudbari-ye Kerman (Rudbari, Halilrud)
Jirofti and Kahnuji
Rukhonei (Rudkhanei)
Rudoni (Rudani)
Minowi group: covering Minowi (Minabi), Hormuzi (Hormozi), Banzarki, Shahrichi (Shahri)
Glangli (Galangi)
Bandar Abbās group: Ashomi, Fini, Surui (Suru'i), Bandari of Bandar Abbas, Khamiri, Kongi, Chahvazi
Keshmi (Qeshmi, Qishmi, Jazirati "Islander")

Kahnuji and Jirofti are close, but Jirofti has been influenced by Kermani Persian, which is replacing it.

Pahlavani is spoken by an ethnically Indo-Aryan (Koli) people. Its vocabulary is somewhat different, some reportedly modified through reversals of syllables and the like. 'Pahlavani' is the endonym.

Rudani has many words and grammatical structures from Southern Balochi. Grammatically, Korta is similar to other varieties of Bandari, but its vocabulary is closer to that of Balochi. It is now moribund.

References 

Languages of Iran
Southwestern Iranian languages